LCISD can refer to:

 Lamar Consolidated Independent School District
 Lubbock-Cooper Independent School District
 Lyford Consolidated Independent School District